Ashley Ann Owusu (born January 22, 2001) is an American college basketball player for the Virginia Tech Hokies of the Atlantic Coast Conference.

College career

Maryland 
Owusu was thrust into a leadership role in her sophomore season after five seniors graduated and three players transferred out of the program. She scored her then-career high of 25 points in a game against Towson, breaking it less than a month later with a 34-point performance against Penn State.

In addition to being named a third-team All-American, Owusu was also named the recipient of the Ann Meyers Drysdale Award, awarded to the top college basketball shooting guard in the country.

Virginia Tech
On May 4, 2022, Virginia Tech head coach Kenny Brooks announced that his team had added Owusu to their team with two years of eligibility remaining.

National team career 
Owusu accepted an invite to attend AmeriCup trials for the United States national team in 2021.

Career statistics

College 

|-
| style="text-align:left;" | 2019–20
| style="text-align:left;" | Maryland
| 32 || 16 || 27.0 || .446 || .310 || .732 || 3.8 || 5.4 || 1.5 || 0.2 || 2.4 || 12.0
|-
| style="text-align:left;" | 2020–21
| style="text-align:left;" | Maryland
| 29 || 29 || 31.1 || .493 || .289 || .762 || 5.6 || 5.9 || 1.3 || 0.2 || 2.6 || 17.9
|-
| style="text-align:center;" colspan=2 | Career
| 61 || 45 || 29.0 || .472 || .300 || .749 || 4.7 || 5.7 || 1.4 || 0.2 || 2.5 || 14.8

References

External links 
 
 
 Maryland Terrapins profile
 USA Basketball profile

2001 births
Living people
Sportspeople from Queens, New York
Basketball players from New York City
People from Woodbridge, Virginia
Basketball players from Virginia
Shooting guards
Maryland Terrapins women's basketball players
All-American college women's basketball players